Segunda División Profesional del Fútbol Profesional Chileno is the third level of Chilean football Chilean football league system, since the season 2012, is organized by the Asociación Nacional de Fútbol Profesional.

The Chilean Segunda División Profesional was established in 2012.

Current teams

These are the teams participating in the Chilean Segunda División, season 2023:

Segunda División Champions

Titles by club

References
 ANFP confirms the new second division
 Segunda división teams and matches

 
3
2011 establishments in Chile
Chile